is awarded to people from all parts of the world whose "original and outstanding achievements in science and technology are recognized as having advanced the frontiers of knowledge and served the cause of peace and prosperity for mankind." The Prize is presented by the Japan Prize Foundation. Since its inception in 1985, the Foundation has awarded 81 people from 13 countries.

The Japan Prize consists of a certificate, a commemorative medal and a cash award of ¥50 million. No discrimination is made as to nationality, occupation, race, or gender. Only living persons may be named. Every November, the Japan Prize Foundation selects two fields for the award according to current trends in science and technology. The nomination and selection process takes about one year. The laureates, one from each field, are announced in January.

The prestigious prize presentation ceremony is held in the presence of the Emperor and the Empress of Japan. According to his book Dancing Naked in the Mind Field, Kary Mullis, 1993 Nobel Laureate in Chemistry, addressed Empress Michiko as sweetie when being awarded the prize in 1993 for the development of the polymerase chain reaction. The events are also attended by the Prime Minister, the Speaker of the House of Representatives, the President of the House of Councillors, the Chief Justice of the Supreme Court, foreign ambassadors to Japan and about a thousand other distinguished guests, including eminent academics, researchers and representatives of political, business and press circles. The 2014 Japan Prize Presentation Ceremony was held on April 23 at the National Theatre in Tokyo.

At present the international prize is often considered one of the most prestigious awards in science and technology fields after the Nobel Prize. According to an article in the scientific journal Nature Immunology, the prize is one of the prestigious science awards that recognize immunology as well as Nobel Prize, Sweden (since 1901), Albert Lasker Basic Medical Research Award, USA (since 1946), Paul Ehrlich and Ludwig Darmstaedter Prize, Germany (since 1952), Canada Gairdner International Award, Canada (since 1959), Wolf Prize, Israel (since 1978), and Crafoord Prize, Sweden (since 1980).

Background 
The creation of the Japan Prize was motivated by the desire to express Japan's gratitude to international society. This plan was supported with the funds donated by Konosuke Matsushita, the founder of Panasonic Corporation. He was the first chairman of the Japan Prize Preparatory Foundation.

In 1982 the Japan Prize Preparatory Foundation is established and then the establishment of the Japan Prize is endorsed by the Cabinet. In 1985 The 1st Japan Prize Presentation Ceremony is held in Tokyo.

Laureates

See also 

 List of general science and technology awards

References

External links
 The Japan Prize website

Academic awards
Japanese science and technology awards
International awards
Awards established in 1985
1985 establishments in Japan